The Esiliiga is the second division in the Estonian football league system. The Esiliiga is ranked below the Meistriliiga and above the Esiliiga B. 

As in most countries with low temperatures in winter time, the season starts in March and ends in November. The league features several reserve teams of Meistriliiga clubs. According to the rules set by the Estonian Football Association, reserve teams are ineligible for promotion to the Meistriliiga, but can play in the Estonian Cup.

Competition format
During the season, the teams play each of the other four times, twice at home and twice away. This makes for a total of 36 games played each season. The teams gain three points for a win, one for a draw, and none for a defeat. Promotion and relegation between divisions is a central feature of the league. At the end of the season, clubs at the top of their division win promotion to the next higher division, while those at the bottom will be relegated to the next lower one. At the end of a season, the top Esiliiga club gains promotion to the Meistriliiga. This is providing that the Esiliiga club meets the licensing criteria of the Meistriliiga. Reserve teams in Estonia play in the same league system as the senior team, however, they must play at least one level below their main side, and are thus ineligible for promotion to the Meistriliiga. Two bottom end clubs of Esiliiga are relegated to the Esiliiga B, and two top clubs of Esiliiga B are promoted to the Esiliiga. The two-legged play-offs for the Meistriliiga spot are contested between the ninth placed (second bottom) club in the Meistriliiga and the second in the Esiliiga, and the two-legged play-offs for the Esiliiga spot are contested between the eighth placed (third bottom) club in the Esiliiga and the third in the Esiliiga B.

Clubs

Current clubs
The following clubs are competing in the Esiliiga during the 2023 season.

a – never been relegated from Esiliiga 
b – never played in Meistriliiga 
c – ineligible for promotion to Meistriliiga

Champions

Total titles won

All-time Esiliiga table
The table is a cumulative record of all match results, points and goals of every team that has played in the Esiliiga since its inception in 1992. The table that follows is accurate as of the end of the 2021 season. Teams in bold played in the Esiliiga 2021 season. Numbers in bold are the record (highest) numbers in each column.

In this ranking 3 points are awarded for a win, 1 for a draw, and 0 for a loss. Promotion matches and relegation matches involving clubs of higher or lower leagues are not counted.

The table is sorted by all-time points.

See also
Meistriliiga
Esiliiga B

References

External links
 Official website 

 
2
Second level football leagues in Europe
Estonian Football Championship